The Carbon Border Adjustment Mechanism (CBAM) is a carbon tariff on carbon intensive products, such as cement and some electricity, imported by the European Union. Legislated as part of the European Green Deal, it takes effect in 2026, with reporting starting in 2023. CBAM was passed by the European Parliament with 450 votes for, 115 against, and 55 abstentions.

The price of CBAM certificates would be linked to price of EU allowances under the European Union Emissions Trading System and it is designed to stem carbon leakage from countries without a carbon price.

As a result of the CBAM, these industries can experience an increase in supply chain costs. The cost of importing these commodities into the  European Union. can increase, which will lead to an increase in the cost of the respective commodities and the secondary products and services that rely on them. Exporters into the EU will be particularly affected by the CBAM. These companies will be required to report their emissions and purchase CBAM certificates, which will increase their costs and reduce their profitability. 

Some observers have warned about the potential economic risks to the Global South, as developing nations may struggle to decarbonise fast enough to remain competitive in the global market. The transition to a low-carbon economy requires technology and investment beyond the resources of many countries; proposed solutions include technology transfer and green finance.

References

External links 
 Carbon Border Adjustment Mechanism proposal

Customs duties
Greenhouse gas emissions
Emissions trading
Climate change policy